Josette Vidal (born 25 March 1993) is a Venezuelan television actress. She is most recognized for her portrayal of Melibea Fuentes Cordero, on the Televen drama telenovela Nacer contigo.

Filmography

Awards and nominations

References

External links 
 

1993 births
Living people
Venezuelan television actresses
Venezuelan telenovela actresses
Venezuelan stage actresses
21st-century Venezuelan actresses